Faithful is Todd Rundgren's seventh album, released in 1976.

Origins
Rundgren explained the motivation of the first side as treating rock music like European classical music, where a piece is performed over and over again in essentially the same way. The album's core group of musicians—Rundgren, Wilcox, Siegler and Powell (all members of Utopia)—makes this a Utopia album in all but name, though other official Utopia albums featured songs written by other members of the band and not just by Rundgren.

The first side is dedicated to "faithful" re-recordings—near-replications of the originals—of some classic 1960s psychedelic-era songs, while side two comprised original material. Critic Robert Christgau called the second side Rundgren's "clearest and most interesting set of songs since Something/Anything?"   and magazine Rolling Stone's rock critic John Milward said "the original material that fills side two is a more ambitious tribute to his influences and his strongest collection of pop tunes since his classic "Something/Anything"."

The closing song, "Boogies (Hamburger Hell)", opens with a reference to Beefsteak Charlie's, which former Utopia drummer Kevin Ellman was currently operating along with his family.

Release
The album was released in May 1976 with virtually no advertising. Bearsville Records' president Paul Fishkin believed Rundgren fans would purchase just as many albums as his previous releases based on word of mouth. The remake of The Beach Boys' "Good Vibrations" and One Rundgren tune "Love of the Common Man" were released as singles and charted briefly but the album itself made it to #54 on the Billboard Album Charts.

Track listing

Side one
"Happenings Ten Years Time Ago" (Jeff Beck, Jim McCarty, Jimmy Page, Keith Relf) – 3:12
"Good Vibrations" (Brian Wilson, Mike Love) – 3:44
"Rain" (Lennon–McCartney) – 3:16
"Most Likely You Go Your Way and I'll Go Mine" (Bob Dylan) – 3:24
"If Six Was Nine" (Jimi Hendrix) – 4:55
"Strawberry Fields Forever" (Lennon–McCartney) – 3:53

Side two
All songs written by Todd Rundgren
"Black and White" – 4:42
"Love of the Common Man" – 3:35
"When I Pray" – 2:58
"Cliché" – 4:00
"The Verb "To Love"" – 7:25
"Boogies (Hamburger Hell)" – 5:00

Personnel
Todd Rundgren – guitar, vocals, all instruments on "When I Pray",  producer 
Roger Powell – trumpet, keyboards, rhythm guitar on "If Six Was Nine"
John Siegler – bass, cello
John Wilcox – drums

Charts

Weekly charts

Single

References 

Todd Rundgren albums
1976 albums
Albums produced by Todd Rundgren
Covers albums
Bearsville Records albums
Rhino Records albums
Song recordings produced by Todd Rundgren